Ummidia richmond is a species of spider in the family Halonoproctidae. It is endemic to Florida.

The specific name richmond is taken from the endangered pine rockland habitat around Naval Air Station Richmond.

References

Halonoproctidae
Spiders of the United States